The Michelob Light Classic was a golf tournament on the LPGA Tour from 1994 to 2001. It was played at two different courses in the St. Louis, Missouri area. From 1994 to 1999, it was played at the Forest Hills Country Club in Chesterfield. In 2000 and 2001, it was played at the Fox Run Golf Club in Eureka. Annika Sörenstam won four of the eight editions of the tournament.

Winners
Michelob Light Classic
2001 Emilee Klein
2000 Lorie Kane
1999 Annika Sörenstam
1998 Annika Sörenstam
1997 Annika Sörenstam

Michelob Light Heartland Classic
1996 Vicki Fergon

GHP Heartland Classic
1995 Annika Sörenstam
1994 Liselotte Neumann

References

Former LPGA Tour events
Golf in Missouri
History of women in Missouri